William Couper (or Cowper) (1568–1619) was a Bishop of Galloway in Scotland.

Life
The son of John Couper, merchant-tailor, of Edinburgh, he was born in 1568. After receiving some elementary instruction in his native city, and attending a school at Dunbar for four years, he entered in 1580 the university of St. Andrews, where he graduated M. A. in 1583. He then went to England, where he was for some years assistant-master in a school at Hoddesdon, Hertfordshire.

Returning to Edinburgh he was licensed a preacher of the church of Scotland in 1586, and admitted minister of the parish of Bothkennar, Stirlingshire, in August 1587, whence he was translated to the second charge of Perth in October 1595. He was a member of six of the nine assemblies of the church from 1596 to 1608. Although one of the forty-two ministers who signed the protest to parliament, 1 July 1606, against the introduction of episcopacy, in 1608 he attended the packed assembly regarded by the presbyterians as unconstitutional, and from this time concurred in the measures sanctioned by the royal authority in behalf of episcopacy. When present at court in London in the latter year, he was sent by the king to the Tower to deal with Andrew Melville, but as he was unable to influence him the matter was left to John Spottiswood. He was promoted to the bishopric of Galloway on 31 July 1612, and was also made Dean of the Chapel Royal.

His character as delineated by Calderwood is by no means flattering, but the portrait is doubtless coloured by party prejudice. "He was", says Calderwood, "a man filled with self-conceate, and impatient of anie contradiction, more vehement in the wrong course than ever he was fervent in the right, wherein he seemed to be fervent enough. He made his residence in the Canongate, neere to the Chapell Royall, whereof he was deane, and went sometimes but once in two years till his diocese. When he went he behaved himself verie imperiouslie". Spottiswood, on the other hand, was of opinion that he "affected too much the applause of the people".

Four days before he died a number of accusations were made against him. Two days before he died he is said to have been playing golf on Leith Links when he saw a vision which frightened him so much that he threw his clubs away. His golf partners saw nothing and sent him home to rest. He took to bed and did not recover.

He died on 16 February 1619, and was interred in Greyfriars Kirkyard in central Edinburgh. The grave lies immediately south of the church.

Works
Couper had the leading role in the composition of the prayer-book completed in 1619; but never brought into use. He produced extensive religious writings. In his lifetime were published:
The Anatomy of a Christian Man, 1611
Three Treatises concerning Christ, 1612
The Holy Alphabet of Zion's Scholars; by way of Commentary on the cxix. Psalm, 1613
Good News from Canaan; or an Exposition of David's Penitential Psalm after he had gone in unto Bathsheba, 1613;
A Mirror of Mercy; or the Prodigal's Conversion expounded, 1614
Dikaiologie; containing a just defence of his former apology against David Hume, 1614
Sermon on Titus ii. 7, 8, 1616
Two Sermons on Psalm cxxi. 8, and Psalm lxxxviii. 17, 1618
Pathmos: A Commentary on the Revelations, 1619. This work expressed Couper's admiration for John Napier of Merchiston. It was directed against the Revelation of the Revelation of Thomas Brightman, which while critical of the apocalyptic ideas of John Foxe shared Foxe's Anglocentric vision.

His Works, to which was prefixed an account of his life, appeared in 1623, 2nd ed. 1629, 3rd 1726; and the Triumph of the Christian in three treatises appeared in 1632.

References

Attribution

 Article cites the following sources: Life prefixed to his Works; Histories of Calderwood and Spotiswood; Thomas Murray's Literary History of Galloway, 86–101; M'Crie's Life of Andrew Melville; Keith's Catalogue of Scottish Bishops; Hew Scott's Fasti Eccles. Scot. ii. 614, 693.

Further reading
Keith, Robert, An Historical Catalogue of the Scottish Bishops: Down to the Year 1688, (London, 1824)
Watt, D. E. R., Fasti Ecclesiae Scotinanae Medii Aevi ad annum 1638, 2nd Draft, (St Andrews, 1969)

External links

1568 births
1619 deaths
Alumni of the University of St Andrews
Bishops of Galloway (Church of Scotland)
Burials at Greyfriars Kirkyard
Members of the Parliament of Scotland 1612
Members of the Convention of the Estates of Scotland 1617
16th-century Ministers of the Church of Scotland
Scottish male golfers